Barry Jenkins (born November 19, 1979) is an American filmmaker. After making his filmmaking debut with the short film My Josephine (2003), he directed his first feature film Medicine for Melancholy (2008) for which he received an Independent Spirit Award nomination for Best First Feature. He is also a member of The Chopstars collective as a creative collaborator.

Following an eight-year hiatus from feature filmmaking, Jenkins directed and co-wrote the LGBT-themed independent drama Moonlight (2016), which won numerous accolades, including the Academy Award for Best Picture. Jenkins received an Oscar nomination for Best Director and jointly won the Academy Award for Best Adapted Screenplay with Tarell Alvin McCraney. He became the fourth black person to be nominated for Best Director and the second black person to direct a Best Picture winner. He released his third directorial feature If Beale Street Could Talk in 2018 to critical praise, and earned nominations for his screenplay at the Academy Awards and Golden Globes.

He is also known for his work in television. Jenkins directed "Chapter V" of the Netflix series Dear White People in 2017. In 2021, he created and directed the Amazon Video limited series The Underground Railroad based on the novel of the same name and received a Primetime Emmy Award for Outstanding Directing for a Limited Series or Movie nomination, and won a Peabody Award.

In 2017, Jenkins was included on the annual Time 100 list of the most influential people in the world.

Early life
Jenkins was born in 1979 at Jackson Memorial Hospital in Miami, Florida, the youngest of four siblings, each from a different father. His father separated from his mother while she was pregnant with Jenkins, believing that he was not Jenkins's father; he died when Jenkins was 12. Jenkins, in later life, still has "no idea who my 'real' father is". "I don't think any of us were planned, but I was definitely a mistake", he had later said.

His mother, a nurse, suffered from a crack-cocaine addiction, and was a teenage runaway whom Jenkins has said abandoned him. Jenkins grew up in Liberty City, a neighborhood of Miami, and was primarily raised by another older woman (who had also looked after his mother while she was a teenager) in an overcrowded apartment: "I wasn’t raised by anyone who was a blood relative of mine, and yet I could see my blood relatives all around the neighborhood because things were just so, so bad". As a teenager Jenkins lived with friends from Miami Northwestern Senior High School, at which he played football and ran track. His disordered and lonely childhood led him to retreat inwards and develop an active imagination. He hoped to pursue a creative-writing degree.

Jenkins studied film at the Florida State University College of Motion Picture Arts (FSU), where he met many of his future frequent collaborators, including cinematographer James Laxton, producer Adele Romanski and editors Nat Sanders and Joi McMillon. His decision to study there was instigated by an initial visit: "I thought: This is the blackest place in America. I gotta be here". Feeling inadequate in regards to his technological skillmanship, Jenkins took a year off to advance it. Jenkins felt a general lack of confidence at the start of the programme, which began for Jenkins in a spontaneous manner. To resolve his personal misgivings he looked towards foreign arthouse cinema, in a divergence from the inspirations of his classmates, such as Steven Spielberg, James Cameron, and Wes Anderson.

While at Florida State, Jenkins became a member of Alpha Phi Alpha fraternity. Four days after graduating from FSU, he moved to Los Angeles to pursue a filmmaking career, spending two years working on various projects as a production assistant. He became disillusioned with "Hollywood film-making" after working for Harpo Productions, an experience which contrasted with his time studying film, reflecting that "At school, film-making had been the most beautiful thing that ever happened to me".

Career

2000s–2010s: Early work 

Jenkins' first film was his 2001 short My Josephine, which follows the romantic life of a young Arabic-speaking man, following the September 11 attacks. Previously he had fretted over his chances of success due to his racial and class identity, but My Josephine demonstrated that "I could do the work to make myself as accomplished as anyone else". He then explored black children being tried as adults for the deaths of their peers in Little Brown Boy.

He'd later follow it up with Medicine for Melancholy. The film, which has been linked to the mumblecore scene, stars Wyatt Cenac and Tracey Heggins. The impetus being the lack of low-budget mumblecore films which featured African-Americans, Jenkins recalled that the movie represented the "place where I was both physically, emotionally, and mentally". Well received by critics, the film underwent "the usual tour of festivals garnering its share of nominations, reviews, small awards and limited release distribution in major cities in 2009 and 2010".

Following Medicine for Melancholy, Jenkins wrote multiple scripts: an epic for Focus Features about "Stevie Wonder and time travel" and adaptations of If Beale Street Could Talk and a memoir by Bill Clegg. He later worked as a carpenter and co-founded Strike Anywhere, an advertising company. In 2011, he wrote and directed Remigration, a sci-fi short film about gentrification. Jenkins became a writer for HBO's The Leftovers, about which he has said, "I didn't get to do much." In 2012, he received a United States Artists Fellowship grant. During this time period, he reckoned he matured as both a person and an artist. The lack of fruition with his scripts led him to consider if he was unable to produce another film; his next feature, he said, "just came to me".

2016: Moonlight 

Jenkins directed and co-wrote, with Tarell Alvin McCraney, the 2016 drama Moonlight, his first feature film in eight years. It's an adaptation of McCraney's play In Moonlight Black Boys Look Blue. Both lives influenced the production, having spent their childhoods in close proximity although without knowing each other; Jenkins found the main character, Chiron, reflective of himself. Jenkins did hold "some reservations and doubts" about adapting McCraney's play on account of being heterosexual, however their shared characteristics and McCraney's trust in Jenkins emboldened him. Jenkins' screenplay – which he composed in ten days – expands upon McCraney's story, having more resources and control at his disposal than he had before. The movie was shot in 25 days, in Miami; the filming described by Naomie Harris as "very low-budget, it was very intimate film-making, collaborative". It premiered at the Telluride Film Festival in September 2016 to a substantial amount of awards and critical acclaim. According to film scholar Rahul Hamid, it was among the "most celebrated films of 2016, boasting ... inclusion in all of the major top ten lists". "He became the breakout of the year", said Camonghne Felix.

The film won dozens of accolades, including the Golden Globe Award for Best Picture – Drama and the Academy Award for Best Picture at the 89th Academy Awards. Jenkins and McCraney also won Best Adapted Screenplay. Overall, the film received eight Oscar nominations, including Best Director. Described as historic, Justin Gomer, scholar of American Studies, said that is "the most racially significant film to ever win", with it affecting the overall "whiteness" of the Oscars. Anthropologist Elizabeth Davis stated that Moonlight and similar films' acclaim indicates an "increase in the social and institutional recognition and approval of blackness".

In 2022, in a poll of 1,639 participating critics, programmers, curators, archivists and academics, Sight and Sound crowned Moonlight as the 60th greatest film of all time.

2017–present: Further projects 
In 2017, Jenkins directed the fifth episode of the Netflix original series Dear White People, having been chosen due to his work on Moonlight. In line with the show's other directors, Jenkins' work was guided by an overall visual framework, although he was encouraged to be distinctive.

In 2013, the same year he wrote Moonlight, Jenkins had written a film adaptation of James Baldwin's novel If Beale Street Could Talk. Production began in October 2017 with Annapurna Pictures, Pastel, and Plan B. Jenkins worked closely with Baldwin's estate and was given handwritten notes about how he would have approached a film version – "a slow epiphany" is how Jenkins described reading the notes. The adaptation is largely faithful to the source material, although aspects, such as the opening and ending, are changed. The film was released in December 2018 to critical acclaim. It garnered numerous accolades, including Best Supporting Actress wins for Regina King at the Academy Awards and Golden Globes. Jenkins received an Academy Award nomination for Best Adapted Screenplay.

Aided by his previous television work, Jenkins directed the 2021 television series adaptation of Colson Whitehead's novel The Underground Railroad, the series being a passion project for Jenkins. It was initiated by Amazon Studios (and subsequently ordered to series in June 2018) after Jenkins' strong Oscar haul for Moonlight. The main cast of The Underground Railroad includes Thuso Mbedu as Cora, with Chase W. Dillon as Homer and Aaron Pierre as Caesar.

"[Bringing] together a group of disparate artists", Jenkins and the casting director, Francine Maisler, searched worldwide for an actor to play Cora and sought those then-undiscovered. The series' creation was deeply personal – with Jenkins once receiving an assessment by the on-set therapist. It proved to be the most difficult project of his career yet with him feeling a closer attachment to his ancestral past. The show was met with critical acclaim; it was the most recent entry to the BBC's 2021 list of the 21st century's greatest TV shows.

The next major film Jenkins is set to direct is Mufasa: The Lion King, a prequel to the CGI remake of Disney's The Lion King that primarily concerns the coming of age origins of Mufasa. Upcoming projects include a screenplay adapting Virunga, another based on the life of boxer Claressa Shields titled Flint Strong, and a biographical film about choreographer Alvin Ailey which he will direct. More recently, his Pastel production company signed a first look deal with HBO, HBO Max and A24.

Artistry 
Jenkins has a close working relationship with cinematographer James Laxton, stating that "the way we are on set is a shared language, a shared approach to the imagery". On set, Jenkins said that their goal is to incorporate as much of their preceding deliberations as possible whilst still considerate of the actors' needs and available time. He's stated his approach as precise and intimate: "always on set thinking about what else I can do"; his style has been noted to have specific focus upon the emotive states of the characters. Aaron Pierre described Jenkins as the "as the epitome of a leader ... because he ensured that everyone was feeling safe, everyone was feeling supported". Jenkins has cited James Baldwin as a significant influence, reflecting that in his early career he was "obsessed" with him. Claire Denis' Friday Night was the inspiration behind Medicine for Melancholy. He credits his romantic partner and fellow filmmaker Lulu Wang with inspiring him, "add[ing] rigor to creative practice". Morgan Jerkins opined that Jenkins, who re-reads texts he's adapting, "is not only a filmmaker but also a bibliophile who pulls from both historical and contemporary sources".

Despite a more intense plot and themes, discussing parenting, friendship, and black masculinity, especially in regards to sexual orientation, Jenkins made the decision to invert Medicine for Melancholy's sombre color palette in Moonlight; he wished for the audience to be immersed and for there to be a "softness around the characters" – a desire also reflected in his choice of aspect ratio, 2:35. Each of the film's three distinct chapters feature specific visuals, with the general visuals underscoring the themes of the film and intended to "elevate" the story. Visuals are a key aspect of his storytelling, with focus upon how he can "visually translate [a] story". Various elements of Moonlight represent time, a particular interest of Jenkins; he "transforms time's passing into a series of rites of passage" and uses chopped and screwed's manipulation of time throughout the film.

Moonlight, If Beale Street Could Talk and The Underground Railroad compose, in the eyes of Jenkins, a thematic trilogy, exploring childhood abandonment – including his own feelings. Moonlight depicts his childhood experience as he lived it whereas If Beale Street Could Talk showcased his, at times, desired family; Whitehead's novel helped him process his feelings of abandonment and he recognized separation of family as a prominent aspect of the story. Jenkins has expressed an inclination to empathize with the characters in his work. Adele Romanski identified Medicine for Melancholy, Moonlight, If Beale Street Could Talk as variations upon a template: a love story. Jenkins noted that Moonlight and If Beale Street Could Talk are most similar in their visuals.

Black identity 
In both Medicine for Melancholy and Moonlight, Jenkins couples introspection with speculation upon black identity; Moonlight and If Beale Street Could Talk are "tough but tender meditations on African American lives". Gomer aligned Jenkins with "the history of black independent filmmakers and artists who interrogate the category of blackness itself". Jenkins has stated that, amidst his solemn consideration of the craft and formalism of film, he seeks to articulate his "personal experience, what it feels like to be a young black man in America" – his perception evident in My Josephine, and surmised to be in Moonlight, saying of the former "it fucking worked. I thought, 'This is what I am going to do for the rest of my life.

With Moonlight, Jenkins intertwined "well-known images and stories of contemporary Black life" with queer identity and made the intersectional nature "more legible, not to white audiences but to black communities". Whiteness is diminished in Moonlight, which has been said to defy traditional Hollywood understandings of black masculinity and general black identity, showcasing a spectrum of black sexuality and masculinity. The Underground Railroad similarly breaks away, Jenkins choosing to avoid a portrayal of slaves as solely virtuous – Jenkins having "distinguish[ed]" himself from what Gomer dubs "New Black Hollywood". "I hope it can recontextualise rather than reinforce stereotypes about my ancestors, that have been allowed to persist over the decades", Jenkins said.

After The Underground Railroad's release Felix wrote that Jenkins "is breaking the fourth wall to help Black people look themselves in the eye". She viewed the changed ending of If Beale Street Could Talk as an attempt "to give his mostly Black viewership a happy ending, or at least a happier one". Jenkins has expressed consideration of his audience, considering such a perspective as a byproduct of film's expensive nature, although he does not desire to "make decisions that anticipate the reaction of an audience".

Filmography
Film

Television

Accolades

Notes

References

External links

 
 

1979 births
Living people
African-American film directors
American film directors
Writers from Miami
Florida State University alumni
Best Adapted Screenplay Academy Award winners
Independent Spirit Award for Best Director winners
Film directors from Florida
Screenwriters from Florida
American male screenwriters
African-American screenwriters
21st-century American male writers
21st-century American screenwriters
21st-century African-American writers
20th-century African-American people
African-American male writers
African-American film producers
Film producers from Florida
American television directors
African-American television directors
American television writers
American television producers
African-American television producers